Rhombodera latipronotum is a species of praying mantis in the family Mantidae, found in China.

See also
List of mantis genera and species

References

L
Mantodea of Asia